Traub Glacier is a glacier on Greenwich Island in the South Shetland Islands, Antarctica extending 2.5 km in northwest-southeast direction and 4 km in southwest-northeast direction and draining the east slopes of Dryanovo Heights to flow eastwards into Discovery Bay.

The feature was named by the 1947 Chilean Antarctic Expedition after Lieutenant Norberto Traub, a member of the expedition.

Location

See also
 List of glaciers in the Antarctic
 Glaciology

Maps
 L.L. Ivanov et al. Antarctica: Livingston Island and Greenwich Island, South Shetland Islands. Scale 1:100000 topographic map. Sofia: Antarctic Place-names Commission of Bulgaria, 2005.
 L.L. Ivanov. Antarctica: Livingston Island and Greenwich, Robert, Snow and Smith Islands. Scale 1:120000 topographic map.  Troyan: Manfred Wörner Foundation, 2009.

References

 SCAR Composite Antarctic Gazetteer.

Glaciers of Greenwich Island